Dillinger is a 1960 American TV film starring Ralph Meeker as John Dillinger. It was produced by John Houseman.

It was meant to be the pilot for a new TV series The Lawbreakers.

Cast
Philip Abbott as Harry Pierpont
Steven Hill as Melvin Purvis
Ralph Meeker as John Dillinger
Jane Rose as Anna Sage

References

External links
Dillinger at IMDb

1960 television films
1960 films
American television films
1960s English-language films